Bruce Rosenbaum (born February 4, 1962 in Boston, MA) is an American artist and designer. He is known for his work in Steampunk design, both in his home, The Steampunk House, and for what is produced by his company, ModVic. He has been called the steampunk guru by the Wall Street Journal  and steampunk evangelist by Wired Magazine.

Early life
Rosenbaum grew up in Marblehead, Massachusetts, and attended Marblehead High School, before getting his bachelor's degree in Business at UMASS Amherst. After graduating UMASS, Rosenbaum worked as a Department Manager for Lord and Taylor in Stamford, Connecticut  where he met his wife Melanie. Rosenbaum later attended Duke University and received his MBA. After graduating Duke University, he worked for Sara Lee Direct in Winston-Salem, North Carolina, and then worked for other direct marketing agencies. Rosenbaum, along with his wife, Melanie, started a direct-mail marketing business, N2N Direct, in the 1990s.

Design career
Rosenbaum and his wife started ModVic (from Modern Victorian), a Victorian-home restoration company, in 2007. Combining original Victorian design with modern functionality, the couple completed one major project before the economy's downturn. They then refocused the business on integrating new technologies and appliances into restored period objects. Today, ModVic is a marketed as a steampunk art and design company, repurposing antiques and salvaged objects into useful residential and commercial items.

Along with producing commissioned pieces for clients, Rosenbaum incorporates his design perspective into his family home in Sharon, Massachusetts, popularly known as the "Steampunk House". Their home is also noted as the only functional steampunk art home in the world, and has been featured on MTV's Extreme Cribs.

Rosenbaum's projects include his personal computer workstation housed in a Victorian pump organ, a 6-foot mechanical whale for a hotel in Nantucket, Massachusetts, and a late 1800s bandsaw repurposed as a conference table and workstation.

Rosenbaum is also the Chairman of Sharon Historic Commission, Sharon, MA, and a Trustee of the Charles River Museum of Industry & Innovation, Waltham, Massachusetts.

In addition, with Dr. Ashleigh Hillier, associate Psychology Professor at UMASS Lowell, Rosenbaum has also created a 9-week program called Steampunkinetics: Building Art into Science for kids on the autism spectrum. The program  uses 'Janusian Thinking' and other creative problem solving techniques to turn STEM (Science, Technology, Engineering and Math) into STEAM (adding art) into STEAMPUNK (adding history).

Events

2010
ModVic Steampunk Art Exhibition, Steampunk World's Fair, Piscataway NJ
Steampunk @ Boston Antique & Design Show, Shriner's Auditorium, Wilmington, MA
Steampunk @ Pier Show, Pier 94 – Chelsea, New York NY

2011
Nemo's Steampunk Art and Invention Gallery, 20,000 Leagues, 5-Wits Attraction, Foxboro MA
Back Home to Future Expo, Greater Philadelphia Expo Center, Oaks, PA
Mobilis in Mobili: An Exhibition of Art & Appliance, Wooster Street Social Club (NY Ink), New York, NY
ModVic's World of Steampunk Art & Design, Watch City Festival – Charles River Museum, Waltham MA
Norman Rockwell Museum Goes Back to the Future with Steampunk Night, Norman Rockwell Museum, Stockbridge MA
Steampunk Bizarre Exhibition, Mark Twain Museum, Hartford CT
Steampunk Form & Function Show & Exhibition, Charles River Museum of Industry and Innovation, Waltham MA
ModVic with East Coast Paranormal Research Team, Benjamin Stanley Freeman House, 390 Mount Hope Street, North Attleboro MA

2012
How to Architect Steampunk into Your Design - Steampunk for Architects, ArchitectureBoston Expo (ABX), Boston MA
Steampunkinetics Gallery Show, AFA Gallery – SOHO, New York, NY
Living Steampunk, Boskone 49 – Regional Science Fiction Convention, Boston Westin Waterfront, Boston MA
ModVic's World of Steampunk Art & Design, Watch City Festival – Charles River Museum, Waltham MA
Living Steampunk, Dickens Festival, Salem MA
Steampunk Dickens and his Villain Heads, Pollard Public Library, Lowell MA
Steampunk @ CraftBoston, World Trade Center, Boston MA
Steampunk @ Metro Show, New York NY
ModVic's World of Steampunk Art & Design, Steampunk Industrial Revolution Festival, Nashua NH
Living Steampunk, FaerieCon, Baltimore MD
Steampunk Soiree Steamer and Exhibition, Revolving Museum, Lowell MA
Steampunk Form & Function Show & Exhibition II, Charles River Museum of Industry and Innovation, Waltham MA
Designing Steampunk, DESIGN East, Boston MA
Steampunk @ Antique City, Schaut's Fun Fair, Bethlehem PA
Steampunk @ Brimfield Antique Show, Brimfield MA
Steampunk Historical House Tour, Sharon Historical Society, Sharon MA

2013
ModVic's World of Steampunk Art & Design, RiverFest – Assembly Row, Somerville MA
Steampunk: Nature & Machine, Lockwood Mathews Mansion, Norwalk CT
Designing Steampunk, CreativeMornings Boston, Boston MA
Time Machines: Robots, Rockets and Steampunk, Shelburne Museum, Shelburne VT
Victorian Extreme: American Fancywork and Steampunk, 1850 – Now, Bennington Museum, Bennington VT
Steampunk Dickens and his Villain Heads, WaterFire Festival, Old Stone Bank, Providence RI
Plasma Light Art and Steampunk Design, International Assn. of Lighting Designers, Charles River Museum, Waltham MA
ModVic's World of Steampunk Art & Design, Watch City Festival – Charles River Museum, Waltham MA
Steampunk @ Pier Show Pier 94 – Chelsea, New York NY
Steampunkinetics Rube Goldberg Exhibition’, Northeast Arc, Danvers MA
Steampunk House Tours, Groupon, Sharon MA
20,000 Leagues Steampunk Gala, 5 Wits, Foxboro MA

2014
Steampunk Springfield: Reimagining an Industrial City, March 21 through September 28, Citywide: Springfield Museums, Springfield Armory, UMASS Amherst, Central Library, City-Stage Theater and Springfield Symphony – Springfield, MA
SteamAble: The Steampunk Wheelchair Project –Florence, MA

External links
Bruce Rosenbaum, The Steampunk Museum

References

People from Marblehead, Massachusetts
Isenberg School of Management alumni
Fuqua School of Business alumni
Steampunk
1962 births
Living people
Marblehead High School alumni